Hawaii High: Mystery of the Tiki is a 1994 girl-themed video game developed by Sanctuary Woods.

Plot and gameplay
The player takes the role of Jennifer, who recently moved to Hawaii from New York City, and her Hawaiian friend Maleah who go on a mission to discover the  stolen sacred Tiki god carving.

The player clicks hotspots to interact with the environment and completes a series of puzzles and minigames in order to progress through the story.

Critical reception
Ayelet Sela, director of the documentary Video and Computer Games; Ice Age or New Age For Women, praised the company for releasing a title targeted at the young female demographic in a male-centric industry. The Los Angeles Times felt that despite its good intentions, the game was "dreadful". Wired praised the game for teaching players Hawaiian culture and language. Authors of Feminist Cyberscapes: Mapping Gendered Academic Spaces felt the mystery-laden title offered a less stereotypical gaming experience targeted at girls.

References

External links
 DOSBox emulation

1994 video games
Adventure games
Classic Mac OS games
Mystery video games
Tiki culture
Video games developed in the United States
Video games featuring female protagonists
Video games set in Hawaii
Windows games
Sanctuary Woods games